The 2009 Regions Morgan Keegan Championships and the Cellular South Cup was an ATP World Tour and WTA Tour tennis tournament held at the hardcourts of the Racquet Club of Memphis in Memphis, Tennessee in the United States. It was the 34th edition of the Regions Morgan Keegan Championships and the 24th edition of the Cellular South Cup. The Regions Morgan Keegan Championships was part of the ATP World Tour 500 series on the 2009 ATP World Tour, and the Cellular South Cup was an International-level tournament on the 2009 WTA Tour. Both of the events took place from February 15 to February 22, 2009.

The men's draw was led by Australian Open & San Jose semifinalist plus 2002 champion Andy Roddick, Auckland champion Juan Martín del Potro, San Jose semifinalist plus 2002 runner-up James Blake, Auckland semifinalist and 2006 and 2008 runner-up Robin Söderling, Brisbane titlist Radek Štěpánek, Igor Andreev, Mardy Fish and Auckland runner-up Sam Querrey.

The women's draw was headed by WTA #12 Caroline Wozniacki, Brisbane winner Victoria Azarenka, Lucie Šafářová, Auckland semifinalist Anne Keothavong, Marina Erakovic, Sabine Lisicki, Alla Kudryavtseva and Pauline Parmentier.

WTA entrants

Seeds

Rankings as of February 16, 2009.

Other entrants
The following players received wildcards into the main draw:

 Michelle Larcher de Brito
 Melanie Oudin
 Alexandra Stevenson

The following players received entry from the qualifying draw:

 Jelena Dokić
 Michaëlla Krajicek
 Chanelle Scheepers
 Alexa Glatch

ATP entrants

Seeds

Rankings as of February 16, 2009.

Other entrants
The following players received wildcards into the main draw:

 Andy Roddick
 Marcos Baghdatis
 Donald Young

The following players received entry from the qualifying draw:

 Chris Guccione
 Dudi Sela
 Simon Greul
 Kevin Kim

Finals

Men's singles

 Andy Roddick defeated  Radek Štěpánek, 7–5, 7–5
It was Roddick's first title of the year and 27th of his career. It was his second win at the event, also winning in 2002.

Women's singles

 Victoria Azarenka defeated  Caroline Wozniacki, 6–1, 6–3
It was Azarenka's 2nd title of the year and career.

Men's doubles

 Mardy Fish /  Mark Knowles defeated  Travis Parrott /  Filip Polášek, 7–6(9–7), 6–1

Women's doubles

 Victoria Azarenka /  Caroline Wozniacki defeated  Yuliana Fedak /  Michaëlla Krajicek, 6–1, 7–6(7–2)

External links
 Official site
 Men's Singles draw
 Men's Doubles draw
 Men's Qualifying Singles draw
 Women's Singles, Doubles and Qualifying Singles draws

 
Regions Morgan Keegan Championships
Cellular South Cup
Regions Morgan Keegan Championships and the Cellular South Cupl
Regions Morgan Keegan Championships and the Cellular South Cup
Regions Morgan Keegan Championships and the Cellular South Cup
U.S. National Indoor Championships